The 2019–20 Serie B (known as Serie BKT for sponsorship reasons) was the 88th season since its establishment in 1929. The 20-team format returned after 16 years, the last time being in the 2002–03 season. The season was scheduled to run from 23 August 2019 to 14 May 2020, though on 9 March 2020, the Italian government halted the league until 3 April 2020 due to the COVID-19 pandemic in Italy. Serie B did not resume play on this date. On 18 May, it was announced that Italian football would be suspended until 14 June. On 28 May, it was announced that Serie B would resume starting from 20 June.

Teams 
After one season with 19 clubs, Serie B was played in a 20-team format for the first time since the 2002–03 season.

Among the five promoted teams, Pordenone is the only one to have never played Serie B before. Among the relegated teams, two of them (Empoli and Frosinone) have returned to Serie B after only one season in the top flight.

On 4 July 2019, the Co.Vi.Soc. recommended the exclusion of Palermo from the league due to financial irregularities. The club's exclusion was confirmed and ratified on 12 July, with Venezia being readmitted in place of the Rosanero.

Stadiums and locations

Number of teams by regions

Personnel and kits

* For this season, all the teams participating in the Serie B tournament (except for Brescia) featured the institutional sponsor Facile Ristrutturare (on the left sleeve as a patch).

Managerial changes

League table

Positions by round
The table lists the positions of teams after each week of matches. In order to preserve chronological evolvements, any postponed matches are not included to the round at which they were originally scheduled, but added to the full round they were played immediately afterwards.

Results

Promotion play-offs
Six teams could contest the promotion play-offs depending on the point differential between the third and fourth-placed teams. It began with a preliminary one-legged round played at the home venue of the higher placed team, involving the teams placed fifth to eight. The two winning teams advanced to play the third and fourth-placed teams in the two-legged semi-finals. Those winning teams advanced to the two-legged final, where the winner was promoted to play in Serie A the following season. In the two-legged rounds, the higher seeded team played the second game at home. If tied on aggregate, the higher seeded team advanced.

Preliminary round

Semi-finals

First leg

Second leg

Finals

First leg

Second leg

Relegation play-out
The higher-placed team played at home for the second leg. After being tied on aggregated, the lower-placed team were not relegated directly, but extra time and a penalty shoot-out were played since both teams finished tied on points during regular season.

|}

First leg

Second leg

Season statistics

Top goalscorers

Note
1Player scored 1 goal in the play-out.
2Player scored 2 goals in the play-offs.

Top assists

Note
1Player made 1 assist in the play-offs.

Hat-tricks

Note
(H) – Home  (A) – Away

Clean sheets

Note
1Player kept 1 clean sheet in the play-offs.
2Player kept 2 clean sheets in the play-offs.

Notes

Footnotes

References

External links

 Official website

Serie B seasons
Italy
1
Serie B